Sir George Walker Moseley, KCB (7 February 1925 – 28 September 2011) was a Scottish civil servant. The son of William Moseley, MBE, he entered the Royal Air Force in 1943 and served as a pilot in Iraq, leaving the force in 1948. He studied at Wadham College, Oxford, before entering the civil service. For much of his career he was in the Ministry of Housing and Local Government (where he was principal private secretary to the minister from 1963 to 1965) and then its successor the Department of the Environment, where he was Permanent Secretary from 1981 to his retirement in 1985. He was then chairman of the Civic Trust from 1990 to 2000 and chairman of the British Cement Association at the same time.

References 

1925 births
2011 deaths
Scottish civil servants
Alumni of Wadham College, Oxford
Knights Companion of the Order of the Bath
Civil servants in the Ministry of Housing and Local Government
Private secretaries in the British Civil Service
Royal Air Force personnel